Goose Creek was a former Long Island Rail Road station on the Rockaway Beach Branch. Located on the north end of the trestle across Goose Creek, it had no address and no station house, because it was meant strictly as a dropping-off point for fisherman using a small island in Jamaica Bay.

The station opened in the summer of 1888 and by the following year it served a small community consisting of six fishing clubs, two saloons, and a hotel.  The area was known as a popular fishing ground for weakfish and boats could be hired at the docks.

The Rockaway Beach Branch was electrified on July 26, 1905.  The following year, spoils from the construction of the tunnels leading to Pennsylvania Station were used to fill in the trestle across Goose Creek.  The station closed in September 1935 and by 1940 all of the buildings at Goose Creek were eliminated.

References

External links
Electrification of Rockaway Beach Branch from Ozone Park to Hammels Wye
Station Location on 1924 Aerial Photo
Goose Creek Station site (Road and Rail Pictures)

Former Long Island Rail Road stations in New York City
Railway stations in Queens, New York
Railway stations in the United States opened in 1888
Railway stations closed in 1935
1888 establishments in New York (state)
1935 disestablishments in New York (state)